Lot's Wife is the student newspaper of Monash University's Clayton campus. It is produced by students, for students and operates as part of the Monash Student Association.

History

Lot's Wife began when a collection of Monash (Clayton) students stormed the office of the Monash student newspaper of the time, Chaos, in reaction to the sexist and derogatory material Chaos routinely published. Throughout the 1960s, Lot's Wife remained at the forefront of student media.

Lot's Wife gained its name from the Biblical passage in which Lot and his wife fled Sodom. Lot and his wife were spared from God's wrath at Sodom on the premise that if they left behind the destruction that befell their town without looking back, they would be spared. Once they had escaped, Lot's wife looked back. As a consequence she turned into a pillar of salt for disobeying God's orders.

The message of never looking back has been enshrined in Lot's Wife since its inception and continues to be reflected in each edition of the publication. Many of Lot's Wife’s contributors have achieved considerable notoriety in later life.

Lot's Wife found itself in the middle of a media storm when an article was published and distributed to first year students at the traditional O-Week events discussing different ways to consume and prepare marijuana. The article titled "Cooking with Schapelle" drew the ire of anti-drug groups.

Notable contributors

Lot's Wife is put together through a collaborative effort by students from the Monash Clayton Campus. Some notable past editors and contributors to Lot's Wife include:
 Peter Costello – former Federal Treasurer of Australia. In the 1970s, he wrote articles defending Compulsory Student Unionism while he was a member of the Social Democratic Students Association of Victoria, an affiliate of the Victorian Branch of Australian Young Labor.
 Nick Economou – media commentator on Australian politics and frequently provides commentary for the ABC, and also a senior lecturer at Monash. 
 Jon Faine – former ABC radio presenter
 Phillip Frazer – founder and publisher of Go-Set magazine and the first Australian edition of Rolling Stone.
 Kelly Griffin – editor of national magazine "Burst" within a year of leaving Monash University and now associate editor of Beat Magazine.
 Rachel Griffiths – film and television actress, best known for her role as Rhonda Epinstalk in the 1994 film, Muriel's Wedding, and as Brenda Chenowith in the TV series Six Feet Under.
 James Massola – chief political correspondent for The Sydney Morning Herald and The Age and formerly at The Australian and the Australian Financial Review.
 Antony Loewenstein – Jewish journalist and blogger, regular contributor to The Guardian and author of the controversial book My Israel Question. 
 Michael Leunig  – artist, cartoonist, poet and philosopher, listed as an Australian National Living Treasure. His work is commonly printed in The Age and the Sydney Morning Herald. He provides left-wing commentary on political, cultural and emotional life.
 Aamer Rahman – television writer and stand up comedian, most notably as a member of comedy duo Fear of a Brown Planet. 
 Peter Steedman – journalist, editor, federal Labor Member of Parliament and political activist. 
 Harriet Shing – elected to the Victorian Parliament Upper House at the 2014 Victorian State election representing the Eastern Victoria Region.

Notes

References
MSA.monash.edu.au

External links
 Lot's Wife Homepage

Student newspapers published in Australia
Monash University